Lab 110 is one of North Korea's government hacking organizations, and it is an operation of the Reconnaissance General Bureau.

See also 
 Unit 180
 Bureau 121

References

Further reading 

 
 
 

Reconnaissance General Bureau
Information operations units and formations
Cyberwarfare in North Korea